The 1934 South Dakota Coyotes football team was an American football team that represented the University of South Dakota in the North Central Conference (NCC) during the 1934 college football season. In its first season under head coach Harry Gamage, the team compiled a 2–7 record (0–4 against NCC opponents), finished in last place in the NCC, and was outscored by a total of 173 to 73. The team played its home games at Inman Field in Vermillion, South Dakota.

Schedule

References

South Dakota
South Dakota Coyotes football seasons
South Dakota Coyotes football